The federal judiciary of Switzerland consists of the Federal Supreme Court, in Lausanne, the Federal Criminal Court in Bellinzona, the Federal Patent Court, in St. Gallen and the Federal Administrative Court, in St. Gallen. These courts are charged with the application of Swiss federal law through the judicial process.

The Federal Supreme Court in Lausanne is established in the Swiss Federal Constitution as the supreme judicial authority of Switzerland. It is the court of appeal for all decisions of the cantonal courts of last instance, and also for most decisions of the three federal courts of first instance.

The Federal Criminal Court in Bellinzona tries the (relatively few) criminal cases subject to federal criminal jurisdiction, such as cases involving organised crime, terrorism, and crimes against federal institutions. It also decides disputes between cantonal prosecuting authorities. The Federal Administrative Court in St. Gallen reviews decisions made in application of federal administrative law that have been issued by federal and in some cases by cantonal authorities. The Federal Patent Court of Switzerland is a specialized court, which started hearing patent cases in 2012, taking jurisdiction from the cantonal courts.

Notes and references

External links
 Web portal of the Federal Authorities of the Swiss Confederation